Guy Alvin Leader (October 21, 1887 – October 15, 1978) was an American politician and businessman.

Born in Hametown, Pennsylvania, Leader owned a poultry business in York County, Pennsylvania. He served in the Pennsylvania State Senate, as a Democrat, from 1943 to 1951. His son was Governor of Pennsylvania George M. Leader. Leader died in Leader Heights, Pennsylvania.

Notes

1887 births
1978 deaths
People from York County, Pennsylvania
Businesspeople from Pennsylvania
Democratic Party Pennsylvania state senators
20th-century American politicians
20th-century American businesspeople